Zulfiyya Khanbabayeva (born 16 October 1967) is an Azerbaijani singer and performer.

Biography

Childhood - “Bakı Payızı” 

Zulfiyya Khanbabayeva was born on 16 October 1967 in Baku city. They were three child in family: two girls, one boy. From the child years she had an interest for music, and she loved to sing for her grandparents, she had some little concerts.

Zulfiyya studied at school #161. In school years she was singing in Afsar Javanshirov chorus. First time when newspapers wrote about her she was only 12, that time for the poem "Shabi Hicran" (Şəbi-Hicran) by the greatest Azeri poet Fuzûlî in Uzeyir Hajibeyov home-museum. Zulfiyya learned from her mother Azeri national folk music. And she decided to be singer or actress, although her father wished to see her as a student of Foreign Languages Institute. After school she entered  Theater Director faculty. In  student years she directed some plays and played a little roles. The same years she became a friend with - Nigar, and today Nigar Hajizadeh is Zulfiyya's producer. In 1987 Nigar acquainted her with Brilliant Dadashova. And Brilliant listened to her, liked her singing. She told to great Azeri composer Javanshir Guliev to listen to Zulfiyya. Javanshir Guliev saw her talent, and so began to work with Zulfiyya xanim. In 1989 Zulfiyya participated in Bakı Payızı 88 song contest with the Vagif Gerayzadeh song “Səni Xatırlayarkən” (Remembering You) and entered final.

Aypara - Zulfiyya today 

In 1994 Zulfiyya sang in Vagif Gerayzadeh group Aypara. After leaving group Zulfiyya started solo career as singer. Her first album released in 2000 year named Gecə (Night) and became best-selling album of the year in Azerbaijan. She released 2 music videos from this album. In 2002 she released her second studio album Sən Gedən Gündən (Since You've Been Gone) with 3 music videos. Her third studio album Qəlbinə Yol (The Way To Your Soul) released in 2003 year. Music video for title song was the most expensive music video of all times for Azeri show business. From this album were released 1 music video. And the fourth studio album...named Sənsiz (Without You) released in December 2004, but was given to stores on 2–5 January 2005. She released 4 music videos from this album and all became #1 in all national charts. In 2005 she gave 6 concert-programms in the frame of her "Canım Məmləkətim" tour (My Dear Land) in 6 cities of Azerbaijan. She named Deserve Artist of Azerbaijan Republic in November 2003. On 17 September 2008 she named National Artist of Azerbaijan Republic by President of Azerbaijan Republic. Married. On 26 October 2007 was born Deniz, Zulfiyya's daughter. First photos of Zulfiyya Khanbabayeva and her daughter were published by OK Azerbaijan magazine.

Music career

Studio albums 
2000 - “Gecə” (The Night)
2002 - “Sən Gedən Gündən” (Since You've Been Gone)
2003 - “Qəlbinə Yol” (The Way To Your Heart)
2004 - “Sənsiz” (Without You)
2009 - “Dəniz” (The Sea)

Music Videos 
1999 - “Demirəm”
1999 - “Gecikməyin Sevməyə”
2000 - “Aləm Oyansın”
2001 - “Sən Gedən Gündən”
2002 - “Son Gecə”
2003 - “Sənsiz”
2003 - “Qəlbinə Yol”
2004 - “Səninlə”
2004 - “Azərbaycan”
2005 - “Ayrılığa Dözərəm”
2006 - “Gözümün Qarası”
2006 - “Xatırla Məni”
2007 - “Mənimsən”
2010 - “Unut Getsin”
2010 - “Nə Faydası”
2013 - “Sən Azərbaycanlısan”
2014 - “İki Doğma İnsan”
2017 - “Melancholia”
2017 - “Etiraf”

References

1967 births
Living people
20th-century Azerbaijani women singers
Musicians from Baku
21st-century Azerbaijani women singers